Edward Pilsbury (1824–1882) was the 38th mayor of New Orleans (December 19, 1876 – November 18, 1878).

External links
 Administrations of the Mayors of New Orleans - Edward Pilsbury, New Orleans Public Library

Mayors of New Orleans